Tres Marias Residential Golf Club is a 27-hole golf club and residence located in the city of Morelia which is situated in the Western State of Michoacán, Mexico. The Tres Marias Golf course was designed by American golfer and course designer Jack Nicklaus and built in 2002. The Tres Marias Residential Golf Club extends 550 hectares and is covered by a terrain of cliffs, lakes, and rivers. The name "Tres Marias" was given to the golf club as a result of the formation of three rocks in rock monoliths.

History
In 2005, the Tres Marias Golf Club hosted the LPGA Corona Championship. The event was held every year from 2005 to 2010 at Tres Marias during the second week of April. Mexican golfer Lorena Ochoa won the LPGA Championship in 2006, 2008, 2009.

Facilities
The Tres Marias Residential Golf club also serves as a gated housing community and security for Mexican nationals and foreign residents. The country club environment of Tres Marias has a club house with a semi-Olympic indoor and outdoor pool, a gym, spa, game room, Pilates and fitness room. There are also courts for volleyball, tennis, racquet ball, squash, basketball, and two soccer fields. A bike path of 9 km and 3 meters wide is also available for use by guests and members. There are three dining areas.

An equestrian club is also part of the Tres Marias facility and provides forty-three stables, two open tracks for obstacle practice, and one outdoor track with official dimensions.

References

External links 
http://www.tresmarias.com.mx/
https://web.archive.org/web/20090501083857/http://www.ciudad3marias.com/wwwGolf/golf.html
http://www.nicklaus.com/design/tresmarias/

2002 establishments in Mexico
Gated communities
Golf clubs and courses designed by Jack Nicklaus
Golf clubs and courses in Mexico
Sports venues in Michoacán